Thomas Shortalls (c.1370–1445) was an Irish municipal official and judge of the fifteenth century.

He was probably born in Kilkenny where the Shorthalls were a leading local family, but seems to have spent most of his adult life in Dublin. Robert Shorthalls, who was High Sheriff of County Kilkenny in 1421, was probably a relative.   

Thomas is first heard of as clerk to the city of Dublin, and then became Sheriff of Dublin City (the title then was Bailiff) in 1406. He served two further terms as Sheriff, in 1414 and 1424. In 1410 the English Crown granted him an allowance of 28 shillings a year to be paid out of the fee farm rents of Dublin. In the same year he was made Constable of the Dublin wool staple (the centralised system in the port of Dublin for regulation of the wool trade), jointly with Richard Bone. He was Mayor of Dublin in 1420–21. In 1426 he was named as one of the founders of the Dublin Shoemakers Guild.

In 1431 he was appointed a Baron of the Court of Exchequer (Ireland), at a salary of 20 marks per annum. At the time this office did not necessarily require a legal qualification, as Barons in the fifteenth century were often criticised for their lack of learning. However Shorthalls had acted as attorney for his future colleague on the Court of Exchequer, Francis Toppesfeld  (appointed a Baron in 1425) and his wife Alice, during their stay in England in 1410, which suggests that he had more legal knowledge than many Barons. He became second Baron in 1435. He stepped down briefly in 1438 when he was referred to as the "former Baron", and was replaced by Peter Clynton (or Clayton), but he was sitting as a Baron again by 1442. 

He apparently retired in 1443, when John Gough became second Baron of the Exchequer, and died two years later.

People from Kilkenny (city)
Barons of the Irish Exchequer
Members of the Privy Council of Ireland
1445 deaths
Lord Mayors of Dublin
1370s births

Sources
Ball, F. Elrington The Judges in Ireland 1221-1921 London John Murray 1926
Graves, James and Prim, J.G.A. The History, Architecture and Antiquities of the Cathedral Church of St. Canice, Kilkenny Dublin Hodges Figgis 1857
Haydn, Joseph The Book of Dignities  London Longman Brown Green and Longmans 1851
Smyth, Constantine Joseph Chronicle of the Law Officers of Ireland London Butterworths 1839

Notes